Fenton may refer to:

Places

Canada 
 Fenton, Saskatchewan

United Kingdom 
 Fenton, Cambridgeshire, with neighbouring Pidley, part of the parish of Pidley cum Fenton
 Fenton, Cumbria
 Fenton, South Kesteven, Lincolnshire
 Fenton, West Lindsey, Lincolnshire
 Fenton, Northumberland
 Fenton, Nottinghamshire
 Fenton, Staffordshire (Stoke-on-Trent)
 Fenton Tower, East Lothian, Scotland

United States 
 Fenton, Iowa
 Fenton, Kentucky
 Fenton, Louisiana
 Fenton, Michigan
 Fenton, Missouri
 Fenton, New York
 Fenton Township, Whiteside County, Illinois
 Fenton Township, Michigan
 Fenton Township, Minnesota

Other uses
Fenton (name)

See also 
 Fenton's reagent
 Clan Fenton, a Scottish clan
 Fenton Art Glass Company
 Fenton Communications
 Ferrar Fenton Bible, a translation of the bible in modern English
 Fentons Creamery, an ice cream parlor and restaurant in Oakland, California, USA